The 1957 U.S. Women's Open was the twelfth U.S. Women's Open, held June 27–29 at the East Course of Winged Foot Golf Club in Mamaroneck, New York. It was the fifth conducted by the United States Golf Association (USGA).

Betsy Rawls won when the apparent champion, Jackie Pung at 6-over par 298, was disqualified for signing an incorrect scorecard. Her score was kept by playing partner Betty Jameson, the 1947 champion, who had marked a par score of five for Pung on the fourth hole, instead of a bogey six.  Pung made exactly the same error on Jameson's card, who was also disqualified. It was the fourth of eight major championships for Rawls and the third of four U.S. Women's Opens.

The championship returned to the East Course in 1972; the adjacent West Course has hosted many major championships.

Past champions in the field

Source:

Final leaderboard
Saturday, June 29, 1957

 Jackie Pung's score was 78-75-73-72=298 (+6)
Source:

References

External links
USGA final leaderboard
U.S. Women's Open Golf Championship
U.S. Women's Open – past champions – 1957

U.S. Women's Open
Golf in New York (state)
Sports competitions in New York (state)
Mamaroneck, New York
U.S. Women's Open
U.S. Women's Open
U.S. Women's Open
Women's sports in New York (state)